Alexander Dallas may refer to:

Alexander Grant Dallas (1816–1882), British governor of Rupert's Land and Hudson's Bay Company administrator
Alexander J. Dallas (statesman) (1759–1817), American Secretary of Treasury under president James Madison (father of the sailor)
Alexander J. Dallas (U.S. Navy officer) (1791–1844), U.S. Navy officer (son of the statesman)
Alexander Dallas (priest) (1791–1869), Church of England priest founder of the Irish Church Missions to Roman Catholics

See also
Alexander Dallas Bache (1806–1867), American physicist